San Fernando is a village and municipality located in the Catamarca Province in northwestern Argentina.

References

Populated places in Catamarca Province